Cluzel is a surname. Notable people with the surname include:

Jean Cluzel (1923–2020), French politician
Jean-Paul Cluzel (born 1947), French politician
Jules Cluzel (born 1988), French motorcycle racer
Sophie Cluzel, French politician, the Secretary of State for People with Disabilities